Queen Mungong of the Suncheon Bak clan was a Later Baekje royal family member as the second maternal granddaughter of Gyeon Hwon who became a Goryeo queen consort as the first wife of King Jeongjong. She was the second sister, along with Lady Dongsanwon and Queen Munseong.

Posthumous name
In April 1002 (5th year reign of King Mokjong), name Suk-jeol (숙절, 淑節) was added. 
In March 1014 (5th year reign of King Hyeonjong), name Hyo-sin (효신, 孝愼) was added.
In April 1027 (18th year reign of King Hyeonjong), name Gyeong-sin (경신, 景信), Seon-mok (선목, 宣穆) and Sun-seong (순성, 順聖) was added.
In October 1056 (10th year reign of King Munjong), name Jeong-hye (정혜, 貞惠) was added.
In October 1253 (40th year reign of King Gojong), name An-suk (안숙, 安淑) was added to her Posthumous name too.

In popular culture
 Portrayed by Hong Ri-na in the 2002–2003 KBS TV series The Dawn of the Empire.

References

External links
Queen Mungong on Encykorea .
문공왕후 on Doosan Encyclopedia .

Royal consorts of the Goryeo Dynasty
Korean queens consort
Year of birth unknown
10th-century Korean people
Year of death unknown